USS Rappahannock (AF-6) was a Rappahannock-class stores ship acquired by the U.S. Navy for use in World War I. She served in the dangerous North Atlantic Ocean, delivering animals, such as horses and steers on-the-hoof, to American Expeditionary Force troops in Europe.

Acquiring an enemy's ship 

The first Rappahannock (Id. No. 1854) was launched in 1913 as SS Pommern by the Bremer-Vulcan yards, Vegesack, Germany, for the North German Lloyd Line.  She was the third freighter of the Rheinland-Class built for the company's Australia freight service line via the Cape of Good Hope. SS Pommern was voluntarily interned in Honolulu after the outbreak of World War I in Europe and was seized when the United States entered the war. She was then assigned to the US Navy by the U.S. Shipping Board; converted; delivered to the Navy 7 December 1917; renamed Rappahannock; and commissioned 8 December 1917.

Horses and steers for U.S. troops in Europe 
 
Assigned to the Naval Overseas Transportation Service as an animal transport, Rappahannock completed her fourth transatlantic run to France on 16 November 1918, 5 days after the Armistice.

Post-World War I operations 

Remaining in NOTS until transferred to Train, Atlantic Fleet, on 4 February 1919, she completed one more round-trip from New York to Europe before being assigned temporary reserve status at Portsmouth in the summer of 1919. She was returned to active status in June 1922 with the designation AF-6 and, for the next 2½ years, carried cargo for both the Atlantic and Pacific Fleets.

Final decommissioning and World War II service 
 
Rappahannock decommissioned 10 December 1924 and remained in reserve at Mare Island until struck from the Navy list 19 July 1933. She was sold to the Luckenbach Steamship Co., New York City on 5 October 1933; was renamed SS William Luckenbach; and operated under that name through World War II. Sold to the Italian company Giacomo Costa fu Andrea in November 1946, she became that company's first passenger carrier and continued her merchant service under the Italian flag through the end of 1952 when she was scrapped.

References

External links 
 Dictionary of American Naval Fighting Ships
 NavSource Online: Service Ship Photo Archive - ID-1854 / AF-6 Rappahannock

1913 ships
Ships built in Bremen (state)
Ships of Costa Cruises
Ships of Norddeutscher Lloyd
Cargo ships of the United States Navy
World War I auxiliary ships of the United States